Paul Dowswell (1957) is a British writer of nonfiction and young adult novels who has written over 70 books for British publishers.  He was a senior editor at Usborne Publishing, then went freelance in 1999.

Early life and education 
Dowswell was born in 1957 in Chester, England. He has a degree in history from Goldsmith's College, earned in 1978.

Career 
Dowswell worked for Time-Life Books, the Science Museum and the British Library Sound Archive before joining Usborne Publishing. He was a senior editor for eight years at Usborne. He is an instructor in creative writing at Midlands Arts Centre in Birmingham, England.

Book awards
The Complete Book of the Microscope (with co-author Kirsteen Rogers) won the 1999 Rhône-Poulenc Junior Prize for Science Books.

Auslander won the Hamelin Associazione Culturale Book Prize, Bologna, The Portsmouth Book Award, The Essex Book Award, Calderdale Book of the Year, The Cheshire Schools Book Award and the We Read Book Award over 2010-2012.

Sektion 20 won the Historical Association Young Quills Award 2012

Eleven Eleven won the Historical Association Young Quills Award 2013

Personal 
Dowswell lives in Wolverhampton. He is married and they have one daughter. He is a musician and plays with bands at pubs and clubs in the West Midlands.

References

External links
Author's official website

British writers
Living people
Year of birth missing (living people)